The social determinants of mental health (SDOMH) are societal problems that disrupt mental health, increase risk of mental illness among certain groups, and worsen outcomes for individuals with mental illnesses. Much like the social determinants of health (SDOH), SDOMH include the non-medical factors that play a role in the likelihood and severity of health outcomes, such as income levels, education attainment, access to housing, and social inclusion. Disparities in mental health outcomes are a result of a multitude of factors and social determinants, including fixed characteristics on an individual level – such as age, gender, race/ethnicity, and sexual orientation – and environmental factors that stem from social and economic inequalities – such as inadequate access to proper food, housing, and transportation, and exposure to pollution.

Definitions 

Mental health, as defined by the CDC, encompasses individuals' emotional, psychological, and social well-being, while the most common mental disorders include anxiety-disorders such as generalized anxiety disorder, social anxiety, and panic disorder; depression; and post-traumatic stress disorder (PTSD).

The concept of social determinants stems from the life course approach. It draws from theories that explain the social, economic, environmental, and physical patterns that result in health disparities and vary across different stages of life (e.g. prenatal, early years, working age, and older ages). Identifying the social and structural determinants of mental health, in addition to individual determinants, enables policy makers to promote mental health and reduce risk of illness by designing appropriate interventions and taking action beyond the health sector.

Inequities in mental health 
Globally, in 2019, 1 in every 8 individuals (12.5% of the population) lived with a mental disorder; however, in 2020, due to the COVID-19 pandemic, that number grew dramatically by around 27%. While mental illnesses and disorders have become more prevalent, studies have shown that mental health outcomes are worse for some populations and communities than others. One such inequity is that of gender: females are twice as likely to have a mental illness than males.

Fixed characteristics 
Fixed characteristics refers to those that are genetic and biological and/or are not subjected to be influenced by the environment or social living conditions of an individual.

Gender 
The second leading cause of global disability burden in 2020 was unipolar depression, and research showed that depression was twice as likely to be prevalent in women than in men. Gender-based mental health disparities suggest that gender is a factor that could be leading to unequal health outcomes.

Research studies included in Lancet Psychiatry Women's Mental Health Series focuses on understanding why some of these gendered disparities might exist. Kuehner in her article Why is depression more common among women than among men? mentions several risk factors that contributes to these inequities, including the role of a women's sex hormones and "blunted hypothalamic-pituitary-adrenal axis response to stress". Other factors include a woman's increased likelihood to body shaming and rumination and stressors on an interpersonal level, as well as sexual abuse during childhood. Further, the prevalence of gender inequality and discrimination in society against women may also be a contributing factor. Li et al. finds that the monthly and lifespan fluctuations of sex hormones oestradiol and progesterone in women may also influence the gender gap, especially in the context of trauma-related, stress-related, and anxiety disorders, such as through increasing vulnerability to development of these disorders and permitting the continued persistence of symptoms for these disorders.

Increased likelihood of gender-based violence for women compared to men is also another risk factor that was studied by Oram et al. Researchers found that women have a higher risk of being subjected to domestic and sexual violence, thereby increasing their prevalence to post-traumatic stress, anxiety, and depression. Also notable to consider in the context of gender-based trauma are female genital mutilation, forced and early marriage, human trafficking, and honor crimes.  

While women are reported to experience higher rates of depressive and anxiety related disorders, men are more likely to die by suicide than women: in the United Kingdom, suicide is the biggest cause of death for men 45 and younger, and in the likelihood of dying by suicide, men are four times more likely in Russia and Argentina, three and a half times more likely in the United States, and three times more likely in Australia, than women, to name a few countries. Gender differences in suicide are commonly explained by pressure for gender roles and higher risk-taking behavior among men.

Sexual orientation 
In studies comparing mental health outcomes between members of the lesbian, gay, bisexual, transgender, queer (questioning), intersex, asexual and agender (LGBTQIA+) community with heterosexuals, the former showed increased risks of poor mental health. In fact, LGBTQIA+ individuals are twice as likely to have a mental disorder compared to their heterosexual counterparts, and two and a half times more likely to experience anxiety, depression, and substance misuse.

Based on the minority stress model, these mental health disparities among LGBTQIA+ people are due to discrimination and stigma. In fact, LGBTQIA+ individuals have expressed difficulty in accessing healthcare due to experienced discrimination and stigma, which as a result, causes them to not seek healthcare at all or rather delay it. Further societal isolation and feelings of rejection may also contribute to the prevalence of mental disorders among this community. In addition to the perceived and experienced stigma, LGBTQIA+ have an increased likelihood of being victims of violence. These factors, alongside others, contribute significantly to differences in mental health experiences for members of the LGBTQIA+ community in comparison to their heterosexual counterparts, thereby result in mental health inequities by sexual orientation.

Race/ethnicity 
Studies in the conducted in the United States have indicated that minorities have similar or smaller rates of prevalence for mental health disorders as their majority counterparts. Blacks (24.6%) and Hispanics (19.6%) have lower depression rates than their White counterparts (34.7%) in the United States. While racial/ethnic minority groups may have similar prevalence rates, the consequences because of mental illness are more prolonged – which may be partly explained due to the smaller access rates for mental health treatments.  In 2018, while 56.7% of the general US population who had a mental illness didn't seek treatment, 69.4% and 67.1% Black and Hispanics didn't access care. Further, in the instances of some mental illnesses, such as schizophrenia, Blacks in the United States have been reported to have higher rates compared to their White counterparts, however, research suggests that this could be due to an overdiagnosis among clinicians and underdiagnosis for other illnesses, such as mood disorders, for which Blacks had lower reported prevalence rates for major depression. These instances of misdiagnosis may be due to "lack of cultural understanding by health care providers,...language differences between patient and provider, stigma of mental illness among minority groups, and cultural presentation of symptoms.

Environmental factors 
In addition to fixed characteristics, environmental factors, such as adequate access to food, housing, and health and exposure to pollution, impacts an individual’s likelihood and severity of mental health outcomes. Although these factors can not directly change an individual's fixed characteristics of the social determinants of mental health, they can affect the degree as to which an individual is influenced.

Inadequate access to proper food 
Mental illnesses are common among those that are food insecure due to associated factors of stress and weaker community belonging. Food security refers to the state of having access to sufficient and nutritious foods in order to maintain a healthy and active life, and deviations from this can lead to food insecurity. While seen as an economic indicator, food insecurity can increase the risk to mental illnesses through stress, making individuals more vulnerable to worse mental health outcomes.

Another contributing factor that can explain this association between food insecurity and mental illnesses is social isolation. Research, for instance, shows that the majority of food insecure individuals in Canada do not have access to community food programs or food banks, suggesting that there are little to no access to social resources for these people. This factor can impact an individual's ability to feel supported or a sense of belonging within their community, thereby increasing their vulnerability to mental illnesses.

Housing 
Studies have found a co-occurrence between homelessness and mental illnesses. The “housing first” intervention in Canada – the At Home/Chez Soi study – which aimed to provide permanent housing to individuals reported that for the study cohort, suicidal ideation diminished over time. Another study, one of the largest of its kind aimed to characterize the health of Canada’s homeless youth, reported that 85% of its participants had high levels of psychological distress and 42% attempted suicide at least once.

In addition to suffering from mental illnesses, homeless individuals also have trouble accessing care: for example, 50% of homeless men in a New York City shelter reported being overtly mental ill, and nearly 20-35% of mentally ill homeless individuals were in need of psychiatric services. While homeless shelters were once viewed as transient facilities, they have been burdened to take up the role of providing care for the large number of mentally ill homeless people that occupy these shelters. However, a United Kingdom survey found that only 27.1% of homeless shelters believed that their mental health services were adequate to meet the needs of the homeless youth population surveyed in the study.

Pollution 
Despite the vast literature on the effect of air pollution on physical health outcomes, research on the mental health effects of air pollution are limited. Data from the China Family Panel Studies found a positive relationship between air pollution and mental illnesses, where an 18.04 μg/m3 increase in average PM2.5 has a 6.67% increase in the probability of having a score corresponding with a severe mental illness, approximating a cost of USD 22.88 billion in health expenditures associated with mental illness and treatment.

New evidence, although still non-conclusive, suggests the association between various mental health disorders and major environmental pollutants, including air pollutants, heavy metals, and environmental catastrophes, and have found that these pathogens have a direct and indirect role on the brain and in the generation of stress levels. For instance, noise pollution could affect wellbeing and quality of life as a result of disturbances in circadian rhythms, noise annoyance, and noise sensitivity.

Climate 
In addition to the role of pathogen and pollutant exposure on mental health, adverse environmental and climate changes can lead to climate-related migration and displacement that burdens and causes a mental health toll on impacted individuals. From the disruption of social ties and support systems in their native communities to the financial and emotional stress (often due to the stigma that make it hard for climate migrants to integrate) that arises due to relocating, climate migrants experience negative mental health outcomes. Forced migrants, compared to host populations, experience more common mental health disorders, including post-traumatic stress disorder, anxiety, major depression, psychosis, and suicidality due to the stressors that they experience.

Changes in climate can also impact food security in regions, food prices, and household livelihoods, thereby impacting the mental health of residents. In an Australian sample, drought was reported to affect food availability, resulting in individuals skipping meals; individuals consuming below-average food levels expressed higher levels of distress compared to those eating at above-average levels.

Social factors

Discrimination

Stigma

Other factors

Biological factors

Interventions

References 

Public health
Determinants of health
Social problems in medicine
Mental health